Sir Albert Cunningham (or Conyngham) (died 5 September 1691) was the first Colonel of a regiment of dragoons which evolved to become the 6th (Inniskilling) Dragoons.

He was one of the twenty-seven children of Alexander Cunningham, Dean of Raphoe, who emigrated to Ireland from Scotland, and Marian Murray, daughter of John Murray of Broughton, Edinburgh. He married Margaret Leslie, daughter of Henry Leslie, Bishop of Meath, and Jane Swinton, and had one son, Henry.

Military career
Cunningham became Lieutenant-General of the Ordnance in Ireland in 1660. He stood down from that role in 1687 and went on to raise a regiment of dragoons in 1689. He fought on the side of Prince William of Orange at the Battle of the Boyne in July 1690 and the Siege of Limerick in August 1691. He was killed by a Roman Catholic soldier while being held as a prisoner of war near Collooney in County Sligo on 5 September 1691.

A portrait of Cunningham is at Springhill House.

References

1691 deaths
Williamite military personnel of the Williamite War in Ireland
6th (Inniskilling) Dragoons officers